In five-dimensional Euclidean geometry, the 5-simplex honeycomb or hexateric honeycomb is a space-filling tessellation (or honeycomb or pentacomb). Each vertex is shared by 12 5-simplexes, 30 rectified 5-simplexes, and 20 birectified 5-simplexes. These facet types occur in proportions of 2:2:1 respectively in the whole honeycomb.

A5 lattice 
This vertex arrangement is called the A5 lattice or 5-simplex lattice. The 30 vertices of the stericated 5-simplex vertex figure represent the 30 roots of the  Coxeter group.  It is the 5-dimensional case of a simplectic honeycomb.

The A lattice is the union of two A5 lattices:

 ∪ 

The A is the union of three A5 lattices:

 ∪  ∪ .

The A lattice (also called A) is the union of six A5 lattices, and is the dual vertex arrangement to the omnitruncated 5-simplex honeycomb, and therefore the Voronoi cell of this lattice is an omnitruncated 5-simplex.

 ∪
 ∪
 ∪
 ∪
 ∪
 = dual of

Related polytopes and honeycombs

Projection by folding 

The 5-simplex honeycomb can be projected into the 3-dimensional cubic honeycomb by a geometric folding operation that maps two pairs of mirrors into each other, sharing the same vertex arrangement:

See also 
Regular and uniform honeycombs in 5-space:
5-cubic honeycomb
5-demicube honeycomb
Truncated 5-simplex honeycomb
Omnitruncated 5-simplex honeycomb

Notes

References 
 Norman Johnson Uniform Polytopes, Manuscript (1991)
 Kaleidoscopes: Selected Writings of H. S. M. Coxeter, edited by F. Arthur Sherk, Peter McMullen, Anthony C. Thompson, Asia Ivic Weiss, Wiley-Interscience Publication, 1995,  
 (Paper 22) H.S.M. Coxeter, Regular and Semi Regular Polytopes I, [Math. Zeit. 46 (1940) 380–407, MR 2,10] (1.9 Uniform space-fillings)
 (Paper 24) H.S.M. Coxeter, Regular and Semi-Regular Polytopes III, [Math. Zeit. 200 (1988) 3-45]

Honeycombs (geometry)
6-polytopes